The Heir of Caladan is a science fiction novel by Brian Herbert and Kevin J. Anderson, set in the Dune universe created by Frank Herbert. It is the third book in the Caladan Trilogy of prequels. The novel was released on November 22, 2022, and was preceded by Dune: The Duke of Caladan (2020) and Dune: The Lady of Caladan (2021).

References

External links

Dune (franchise) novels
Novels by Kevin J. Anderson
Novels by Brian Herbert
Tor Books books
Prequel novels